The 1980 European Taekwondo Championships were held in Esbjerg Denmark between October 14 and 17, 1980 under the organization of the European Taekwondo Union (ETU).

Medal table

Medal summary

Men

Women

References

External links 
 European Taekwondo Union

1980 in taekwondo
European Taekwondo Championships
International sports competitions hosted by Denmark 
1980 in European sport
1980 in Danish sport